The Conservative Catholics were a right-wing conservative political party in Italy, composed by strong conservatives and clericalists.

History
The Conservative Catholics emerged as party in 1913 from the right-wing of the Italian Catholic Electoral Union. In the 1913 Italian general election, the party won 1.8% of the vote and 9 seats in the Chamber of Deputies. In 1919, they merged were merged with other clerical parties and groupings in the Italian People's Party that gained 20.5% and 100 seats in the 1919 Italian general election.

Electoral results

References

1861 establishments in Italy
1919 disestablishments in Italy
Conservative parties in Italy
Christian democratic parties in Italy
Catholic political parties
Defunct political parties in Italy
Political parties established in 1861
Political parties disestablished in 1919
Right-wing parties in Europe
Right-wing politics in Italy